Calibre or caliber is the diameter of a gun barrel.

Calibre or caliber may also refer to:

Science and technology
 Caliber (artillery), a measure of barrel diameter and length
 Caliber (horology), a designation of clockwork movements
 Caliber (mathematics), a cardinal κ associated with a topological space
 Calibre (software), an ebook manager and editor

Arts, entertainment and media
 Calibre (musician) (born Dominick Martin), Northern Irish drum and bass producer
 Calibre (film), a 2018 thriller film

Comics
 Caliber (Radical Comics), a comic book limited series from Radical Comics
 Caliber Comics, an American comic book publisher
 Calibre (comics), an Azteca Publications character
 Caliber, a Marvel Comics supervillain and enemy of Alpha Flight

Other uses
 Caliber 40, an American sailboat design
 Dodge Caliber, a model of car
 Calibre (menswear), Australian clothing company

See also
 Caliper, a measurement device
 Kaliber (disambiguation)
 Opel Calibra, a car